Joseph Preston Price (April 10, 1897 – January 15, 1961) nicknamed "Lumber",   was a Major League Baseball center fielder who played in one game for the New York Giants on September 5, .

Price's contract was purchased by the Giants in late August 1928 on the condition that he be allowed to finish the season with the Greenville Spinners of the South Atlantic League.

Between 1921 and 1929, Price played in the minor leagues of the Southern United States where he was "extremely popular."

In 1934, Price headed the baseball department of a sports coaching school established in Tennessee and directed by Wallace Wade.

References

External links

New York Giants (NL) players
1897 births
1961 deaths
Baseball players from Tennessee
Allentown Dukes players
Augusta Tygers players
Bridgeport Bears (baseball) players
Greenville Spinners players
Gulfport Tarpons players
Johnson City Soldiers players
Kingsport Indians players
Mobile Bears players
Spartanburg Spartans players